Ispahani and Arif Jahan the duo Dhallywood film directors are known for thriller and action genres. They also co-own the film production company’s Diganta Chalachitra and Nakkhatra Chalachitra. They have directed movies for other production company's in Dhallywood all of which were blockbusters.

History
M. N. Ispahani and Arif Al Ashraf are cousins originally from Brahman Baria. They both started their careers with the help of Delwar Jahan Jhantu, a renowned film Director and Producer who is also their uncle. Their brother Shafi Uddin Shafi is a film Director of Dhallywood films.

Early life and career
M. N. Ispahani and Arif Al Ashraf are cousins were brought up in Brahman Baria. They met their uncle Delwar Jahan Jhantu who used to do direct films. He advised them to first assist in film direction and hired them as his film Assistant Director. They did few films, and then Shahidul Haque Shikder helped them in directing their first film ‘Bidrohi Bodhu’ and it was a Blockbuster hit. After that their film journey began as director, then they started producing movies. The first Bengali film they produced was ‘Gulam’ with Shakib Khan, Shabnoor anddipjol in 2001. Since then, they have directed 17 movies and produced 14 movies and has distributed Blockbuster movie Purno Dairgha Prem Kahini 1, Purno Dairgha Prem Kahini 2, Warning and Faad The Trap.
The duo are renowned for taking inspiration from Bollywood films and adding glamour to it.

Filmography

References

External links
 Ispahani Arif Jahan in BMDb
 M. N. Ispahani on Facebook

Bangladeshi film directors
Bangladeshi film producers
Bengali film directors
Duos
Filmmaking collaborations
1968 births
Living people
Bangladeshi theatre directors